Xenocatantops humilis is the type species of grasshoppers in its genus, belonging to the family Acrididae and subfamily Catantopinae.

Subspecies
The Catalogue of Life lists:
 X. humilis humilis
 X. humilis brachycerus

Distribution

This species can be found in India, Indo-China, Malaysia (the type locality is Java), and Papua New Guinea.

Description
The head of Xenocatantops humilis shows a straight frons in the profile and filiform antennae. Hind femora are rather slender, with wide black spots on the back. In the males cerci are quite short, without clear apical bifurcation, bilaterally compressed and apically incurved.

Biology
Xenocatantops humilis must go through about five stages before becoming a winged adult.

Bibliography
Woo, H .P. M., M.K. Tan, 2011. Grasshoppers. Pp. 331–332. In: Ng, P. K. L., R. T. Corlett & *H. T. W. Tan (editors). Singapore Biodiversity. An Encyclopedia of the Natural Environment and Sustainable Development. Editions Didier Millet, Singapore. 552 pp.
Tan, M. K., R. W. J. Ngiam & M. R. B. Ismail, 2012. A checklist of Orthoptera in Singapore parks. Nature in Singapore, 5: 61–67.
Ari Sugiarto -  Comparison of Jumping Distance on Several Grasshopper Species (Orthoptera)

References

External links
 Singapore Biodiversity Online

Catantopinae
Invertebrates of Southeast Asia
Articles containing video clips